Brief Lives is a collection of short biographies written by John Aubrey (1626–1697) in the last decades of the 17th century.

Writing
Aubrey initially began collecting biographical material to assist the Oxford scholar Anthony Wood, who was working on his own collection of biographies. With time, Aubrey's biographical researches went beyond mere assistance to Wood and became a project in its own right.

Aubrey was careful, wherever possible, to seek out and talk with those who had been acquainted with his subjects. His sociable nature and his wide circle of friends helped him in this pursuit. At his death, Aubrey left his biographical writings in a state of chaos. It has been the task of later editors to organise the manuscripts (held at the Bodleian Library) into readable form.

Afterlife
Aubrey's Brief Lives has been loved for generations for its colourful gossipy tone and for the glimpses it provides of the unofficial sides of its subjects. Aubrey's use of informants and his eye for the unusual provides much more vivid pictures than a biography based on documents could. He is frank but never malicious.

The Brief Lives includes biographies of such figures as Francis Bacon, Robert Boyle, Thomas Browne, John Dee, Sir Walter Raleigh, Edmund Halley, Ben Jonson, Thomas Hobbes, William Petty and William Shakespeare. There have been many modern editions.

Patrick Garland wrote and directed a play Brief Lives based on Aubrey's work; featuring Roy Dotrice as Aubrey. The production has been performed worldwide since 1969.

In 2008, Aubrey's Brief Lives was a five-part drama serial on BBC Radio 4. Writer Nick Warburton intertwined some of Aubrey's biographical sketches with the story of the turbulent friendship between Aubrey and Wood. Abigail le Fleming produced and directed.

Notes and references

Sources

Further reading

External links
'Brief Lives', chiefly of Contemporaries, set down by John Aubrey, between the Years 1669 & 1696; edited by Andrew Clark
Volume I A-H at the Internet Archive (note: this edition is not complete)
Volume II I-Y at the Internet Archive
A few "Lives" from Brief Lives at Druidic.org (Thomas Allen, Elizabeth Broughton, Thomas Harcourt, Mary Herbert, William Shakespeare, and Thomas Hobbes)
Mathematician biographies (archived) in John Aubrey's Brief Lives
 

British biographies
English non-fiction books
17th-century books